{{DISPLAYTITLE:C22H17F2N5OS}}
The molecular formula C22H17F2N5OS (molar mass: 437.465 g/mol, exact mass: 437.1122 u) may refer to:

 Isavuconazonium
 Ravuconazole

Molecular formulas